Statistics of Belgian First Division in the 1982–83 season.

Overview

It was contested by 18 teams, and Standard Liège won the championship.

League standings

Results

References

Belgian Pro League seasons
Belgian
1